Pinky Memsaab is a 2018 Urdu-language Pakistani drama film. The film stars Hajra Yamin, Kiran Malik, Adnan Jaffar, Sunny Hinduja, Khalid Ahmed and Shamim Hilaly. It was distributed by Eveready Pictures on 7 December 2018.

Plot summary

The film opens to 21-year old Pinky about to leave her home village in Pakistan for a new job in Dubai. To Pinky, who has never left her village, the airplane, the airport at Dubai, all of Dubai with its glass and steel and air-conditioning is a shock. Her new job, as a maid in a wealthy Pakistani family in Dubai, will pay well. Pinky slowly gets a hold on her new life; she learns to serve her masters and she befriends Grace, the Filipino cook and the Indian driver Santosh. Her employers are among the high society of Dubai: the husband, Hassan Chughtai is a banker, and the wife, Mehr, is a socialite who directs the help in managing the home and her 10-year-old son.

Life as a maid is not as easy as she had hoped. Her employers had wanted a quiet Pakistani girl who would speak Urdu and cook Pakistani food and massage her mistress’ head with oil in the Pakistani way; these are easy for Pinky. The difficulties are around money; Pinky often requires salary advances to send home to her family. Her income pays for food and clothing and in building a new house with a proper roof. One evening Pinky ventures into downtown Dubai and becomes lost on the streets. Mehr and Santosh are worried and Pinky's cell phone is dead. They eventually find her, frightened and shaken, on the street and bring her home. Mehr scolds her and, upon suggestions from Santosh, begins teaching Pinky English and how to present herself. Pinky slowly gains confidence and develops a kind of bond with her new employer/family.

In time Pinky discovers that the life of a socialite wife is not easy either. The home is run by the help, Mehr has little to do and the routine of massages and shopping and parties quickly becomes dull. Some socialite wives start boutiques: clothes, yoga, jewelry. The stuff is bought, cheap, from Asia and marketed as unique and exotic. It does not sell, the boutique is liquidated at a loss and the husband will not fund another experiment. Pinky's employer purported to be a writer. A publisher friend of her husband published her first book which did okay. This publisher received her second manuscript warmly. In the course of editing the book he told her, gently, that the first book was a kind of favor to the husband and that she was not really a writer and ought to try something else. It was a shock to be told this when Mehr, after all the years in boutiques and having and rearing the child, had approached middle age. It was not easy to switch careers at this stage and there was the fear (and the most common topic at socialite-wife parties) that the husband would go to a younger woman.

In one such party a friend of the husband serenades Mehr. Hassan retreats from the party and admits to Pinky that he still loves his wife. Mehr spots them and fearfully concludes there is an affair. She throws a loud public tantrum accusing her husband and the ungrateful Pinky. The party is over. The couple continues fighting in their room. It is the same script: Hassan is exhausted from his job and travel. Mehr resents being called a trophy and accuses him of neglect and adultery and, to fuel the fire, discloses that their child has developed behavioral problems at school. The argument escalates and Hassan pushes Mehr; she hits her head; he leaves home for the night. Mehr takes the child and moves to a friend's house. Hassan storms into the friend's house and forcefully reclaims the child and warns Mehr of the laws of Dubai which permit him to divorce her and get custody of the child – immediately. Mehr returns to Pakistan. Pinky quits the job and moves in with her childhood friend who, like her, works in Dubai.

Mehr returns to Pakistan, to her aging father and his second wife. There is some initial tension between step-mother and step-daughter. In the course of time they all settle into a quiet routine of garden work in the mornings and reading and music into the evenings. Mehr misses Hassan and her son in Dubai. The step-mother dies; this becomes the turning point for Mehr, as she realizes she needs her own family, her child, and she returns to Hassan in Dubai.

Pinky is on her own for the first time in her life. With some help from her friend she looks for work and finally lands a job as a kind of art studio assistant to an artist couple. This is a new experience for Pinky who had only known her village in Pakistan and her ‘banker’ employer in Dubai. One day her employer, the artist, begins painting a portrait of Pinky and innocently makes a pass at her. Pinky is not shocked but surprised; she quits the job and persuades her friend to find something at the friend's job. The friend warns her away. Pinky persists and follows her friend only to discover that the friend is not a beautician as she had claimed. The friend is a bar dancer. Later that evening the friend confides that her own husband had married her in Pakistan in brought her to Dubai and, some years later, left her and her child for another woman. The friend went through her hard knocks and finally settled on this dancer job because the large tips paid her bills and now her child is placed well at an international school in Pakistan. Pinky comes to a sort of reconciliation with this.

Pinky finds another job as a waitress. One day she sees her former employer Mehr, at her restaurant and runs away as  Mehr chases after her. She writes a letter to her: "Dear Madam: I realize you must have been angry that evening, I bear you no grudge and I am thankful to you for bringing me here. I am told you have been looking for me everywhere. You need not look for me. I am no longer the Pinky you had brought here. You need not worry either; I have found my feet and I am OK with my new life. Best wishes, Pinky." Pinky walks away as the film ends.

Cast
Hajra Yamin as Pinky
Kiran Malik as Mehr
Adnan Jaffar as Hassan Chughtai
Sunny Hinduja as Santosh
Shamim Hilaly as JahanAra: Mehr's step mother
Khalid Ahmed as Qutb
Mariel Bianca Salazar as Grace
Hajra Khan as Kulsoom

Notes

References

External links
 

2010s Urdu-language films
2018 films
Pakistani drama films
2018 drama films